Joseph Stevens may refer to:

 Joseph Stevens (painter) (1816–1892), Belgian painter
 Joseph Stevens (archaeologist) (1818–1899), British archaeologists
 Joseph Edward Stevens Jr. (1928–1998), United States federal judge

See also
 Joe Stevens (born 1938), American photographer
 Joseph Stephens (disambiguation)